Wenrich  may refer to:
 Wenrich of Trier (eleventh century), a German ecclesiastico-political writer
 Bart Wenrich, American television producer
 Percy Wenrich (1880–1952), an American composer of ragtime and popular music